The 2019 Macha Lake Open was a professional tennis tournament played on outdoor clay courts. It was the eighteenth edition of the tournament which was part of the 2019 ITF Women's World Tennis Tour. It took place in Staré Splavy, Czech Republic between 17 and 23 June 2019.

Singles main-draw entrants

Seeds

 1 Rankings are as of 10 June 2019.

Other entrants
The following players received wildcards into the singles main draw:
  Denisa Allertová
  Monika Kilnarová
  Jesika Malečková
  Magdaléna Pantůčková

The following players received entry from the qualifying draw:
  Amina Anshba
  Maja Chwalińska
  Anastasia Dețiuc
  Paula Kania
  Giorgia Marchetti
  Teliana Pereira
  Gabriela Talabă
  Nikola Tomanová

Champions

Singles

 Barbora Krejčíková def.  Denisa Allertová, 6–2, 6–3

Doubles

 Natela Dzalamidze /  Nina Stojanović def.  Kyōka Okamura /  Dejana Radanović, 6–3, 6–3

References

External links
 2019 Macha Lake Open at ITFtennis.com
 Official website

2019 ITF Women's World Tennis Tour
2019 in Czech tennis